The International Monster Truck Hall of Fame, based in Auburn, Indiana, is a shrine to  the best drivers in  history of monster truck competition. The hall is part of the Kruse Automotive and Carriage Museum.

The hall also displays monster trucks from the earliest days of  competition.

First class (2011) 
These were  drivers recognized as the "originals" of the sport
 Bob Chandler – Bigfoot
 Jeff Dane – King Kong
 Dan Degrasso – Beast
 Jack Willman – Taurus
 Everett Jasmer – USA-1
 Fred Shafer – Bear Foot

Second class (2012) 
 Jim Kramer – Bigfoot
 Mike Welch – Mike Welch Motorsports
 George Carpenter – Promoter, Safety Director, and Tech Official
 Dennis Anderson – Grave Digger
 Pablo Huffaker – Jus Showin Off, Grave Digger

Third class (2013) 
 Gary Porter – Carolina Crusher, Grave Digger, Spider-Man
 Allen Pezo – Predator racing
 Dan Patrick – Patrick Enterprises, Samson
 Scott Stephens – King Krunch, Coors Brewer, Auto Value
 Army Armstrong – TV/Live Event Personality/Motorsports Radio

Fourth class (2014) 
 Michael Vaters – Black Stallion, Vaters Motorsports
 Kirk Dabney – Blue Thunder, Nitemare, Extreme Overkill, Monster Patrol
 Jon Breen – Mad Dog
 Diehl Wilson – Virginia Giant
 Andy Brass – Bigfoot

Fifth class (2015) 
 Billy Joe Miles – President at TNT Motorsports
 David Morris – Equalizer
 Gene Patterson – Stomper Bully, Bigfoot, Snake Bite (As Colt Cobra until 1995)
 Alan Tura – Goliath, G-Force

Sixth class (2016) 
 Bob George – Founder of USHRA/SRO (PACE, now FELD)
 Charlie Pauken – Excaliber, Grave Digger, Monster Mutt
 Jerry Richmond – Terminator, Weapon 1, Lethal Weapon, Overkill
 Terry Woodcock – Unnamed and Untamed, Cyclops, Generation X

Seventh class (2017) 
 Gary Cook – Creator of Equalizer
 Jeff Bainter – Driver of Captain USA, High Voltage/Hot Stuff Jeeps
 Mike Galloway – Retired Television/Live Event Personality
 Seth Doulton – Owner of Golden State Promotions
 Jim Reis – Retired driver at Golden State Promotions

Eighth class (2018) 
 Gary Bauer – Driver of Lon-Ranger, Nitemare, Screamin Demon
 Marty Garza – Founder of Overkill Monster Truck racing
 Jack Koberna – Driver of Grave Digger 4, Savage Beast, Cyborg, and Tuff-E-Nuff
 Mike Nickell – Retired Driver of Excaliber

Ninth class (2019) 
Dan Runte – Driver of Bigfoot, Sometimes drove Snake Bite under the name "Rick Rattler"
Aaron Polburn – Founder of Thunder Nationals/Monster Nationals
Cliff Starbird – Monster Vette, Wild Stang, Frankenstein
Jesse Birgy – Driver of Playn For Keeps (Deceased)

Tenth Class (2020)

Dave Marquart- Excaliber (Deceased)
Scott Hess- Bear Foot Sport, Hercules (Retired)
Kevin Dabney- Alien, Chi Town Hustler (Retired)
Mark Bendler- Kodiak, Shockwave (retired)

Eleventh Class (2021)

Tim Hall (Executioner, Rammunition, Iceman, Big Boss, Heavy Metal, crew chief at Hall Brothers Racing)
Mark Hall (Executioner, Raminator, Big Boss, Heavy Metal, Bulldozer, Smoke Craft)
Bobby Holman (Holman’s BEAST, Lucas Oil Stablizer, Craniac, Bear Foot)
John Moore (No Problem!)

Twelfth Class (2022)
Steve Hess (Nitemare)
Don Maples (Samson)
Charlie Mancuso (USHRA)
Steve Combs (Knight Stalker)

References 

Halls of fame in Indiana
Auburn, Indiana
Museums in DeKalb County, Indiana
Automobile museums in Indiana
Monster trucks